Anoectomychus is a monotypic moth genus in the family Geometridae described by Prout in 1915. Its single species, Anoectomychus pudens, described by Swinhoe in 1904, is found in Nigeria.

References

Endemic fauna of Nigeria
Ennominae
Geometridae genera
Monotypic moth genera